The Ten suchnesses are a Mahayana doctrine which is important, as well as unique, to that of the Tiantai (Tendai) and Nichiren Buddhist schools of thought.  The doctrine is derived from a passage found within the second chapter of Kumarajiva's Chinese translation of the Lotus Sutra, that "characterizes the ultimate reality (literally, “real mark”) of all dharmas in terms of ten suchnesses." This concept is also known as the ten reality aspects, ten factors of life, or the Reality of all Existence.

Origin
The list of ten suchnesses is neither found in Dharmaraksha's Chinese translation nor in the Tibetan edition or any of the extant Sanskrit manuscripts. 
  
The Sanskrit editions of the Lotus Sutra list only five elements:

Kumarajiva translates the passage in Chapter Two as:

The discrepancy between Kumarajivas translation and the Sanskrit editions might be due to Kumarajiva's use of a manuscript variant but Groner and Stone suggest that "the expansion of this list to ten is probably
Kumarajiva's invention and may well be presaged in a passage in the Dazhidulun that includes nine aspects."

In the preface of Miraculous Dharma Lotus Flower Sutra with Supplements (添品妙法蓮華經) ( Taisho Tripitaka 0264 ), the two translators, Jnanagupta and Dharmagupta (達摩笈多), stated that they had examined Kumarajiva’s work titled Miraculous Dharma Lotus Flower Sutra, as well as Dharmaraksa’s work titled True Dharma Lotus Sutra, and concluded that the two translation works were based on different sources. Dharmaraksa’s work was based on a Sanskrit scripture written on Tala-leaves (Palm-leaf manuscript), while Kumarajiva’s work was based on a Sanskrit manuscript found in the Kucha kingdom. Jnanagupta and Dharmagupta successfully collected both of them. After comparison, they found out that some contents in the Tala-leaf edition are omitted in Dharmaraksa’s work, and some contents in the Kucha kingdom edition are not presented in Kumarajiva’s work. Therefore they decided to translate the omitted contents, add them to Kumarajiva’s work, and rearrange the chapters, to produce a more complete translation of the sutra.

Kumarajiva’s translations differed from his contemporaries as he was trying to convey the true meaning of the sutras rather than literal meaning. Thus, this can often explain small discrepancies from the original text.

Definitions 
The following definitions are given by the Soka Gakkai English Buddhist Dictionary Committee and describe what each suchness means in more detail:

 Appearance (form): the attributes of everything that is discernible, such as color, shape, or behavior.
 Nature (nature): the inherent disposition or quality of a person or thing that cannot be discerned from the outward appearance.
 Entity (embodiment): the substance of life that permeates as well as integrates both appearance and nature.
The above three suchnesses describe the reality of life itself.  The next six suchnesses, from the fourth through the ninth, explain the functions and workings of life.
 Power (potency): life's potential energy.
 Influence (function): the activity produced when life's inherent power or potential energy is activated.
 Internal cause (primary cause): the potential cause in life that produces an effect of the same quality as itself, i.e., good, evil, or neutral.
 Relation (secondary Cause): the relationship of secondary, indirect causes to the internal cause. Secondary causes are various conditions, both internal and external, that help the internal cause produce an effect.
 Latent effect (effect): the dormant effect produced in life when an internal cause is activated through its related conditions.
 Manifest effect (recompense): the tangible, perceivable effect that emerges in time as an expression of a dormant effect and therefore of a potential cause, again through its related conditions.
 Consistency from beginning to end (complete fundamental whole): the unifying factor among the ten suchnesses. It indicates that all of the other nine suchnesses from Appearance to Manifest Effect are consistently interrelated. All nine suchnesses thus harmoniously express the same condition of existence at any given moment.

Interpretation
The ten suchnesses, or categories, are what led the sixth century Chinese Buddhist philosopher Zhiyi to establish the doctrine of the "three thousand [worlds] in one thought."  
The Tiantai school describes ten dharma realms (ch. shi fajie) of sentient beings: the realms of hell dwellers, hungry ghosts, beasts, asuras, humans, gods (devas), sravakas, pratyekabuddhas, bodhisattvas and Buddhas. According to Zhiyi, each of these ten dharma realms mutually includes all of the other realms, resulting in 100 "states of existence" that share the characteristics of the ten suchnesses. The one thousand suchnesses are active in each of the three spheres (the five skandhas, sentient beings, and their environment) forming three thousand worlds in one thought moment.

Nichiren regarded the doctrine of "three thousand [worlds] in one thought" (ichinen-sanzen) as the fundamental principle of the Lotus Sutra and the very essence of the Buddha's teachings. He wrote in his work Kaimoku-shō (Essay on the Eye-opener) concerning ichinen-sanzen: "The very doctrine of the Three Thousand Realms in One Mind of the Tendai sect appears to be the way to lead man to buddhahood."

Nikkyo Niwano states that the principle of the Reality of All Existence not only analyzes what modern science would analyze in physical substances to the extent of subatomic particles, but also extends to mental state.  Accordingly, everyone's mind has existing within it the ten realms of existence which are said to be found within one another.  The suchnesses reveal the deepest reality inherent within all things, and, consequently, innumerable embodied substances existing in the universe are interrelated with all things.
The suchnesses, one through nine, operate according to the law of the universal truth, namely from the "complete fundamental whole" under which no one, no thing, and no function can depart.  All things, including man, along with their relations with everything else are formed from the Reality of All Existence that is the Ten Suchnesses.

See also 
 Reality in Buddhism
 Tathata

Notes

References

References 
 Burnouf, Eugène (tr.) (1925). Le Lotus de la Bonne Loi : Traduit du sanskrit, accompagné d'un commentaire et de vingt et un mémoires relatifs au Bouddhisme, tome 1. Paris: Maisonneuve
 
 
 Endō, Asai (2014). The Lotus Sutra as the Core of Japanese Buddhism: Shifts in Representations of its Fundamental Principle, Japanese Journal of Religious Studies 41 (1), 45-64 
 
 Hurvitz, Leon (tr.) (1976). Scripture of the Lotus Blossom of the Fine Dharma: The Lotus Sutra. New York: Columbia University Press
 
 
 Lamotte, Etienne (trans.); Nāgārjuna; Kumārajīva (1944).  Le traité de la grande vertu de sagesse de Nāgārjuna (Mahāprajñāpāramitāśāstra). Louvain: Bureaux du Muséon
 
 
 
 
 

 Watson, Burton (tr.) (2009).  The Lotus Sutra and Its Opening and Closing Sutras. Tokyo: Soka Gakkai .; p. 57
 Wogihara, U.; Tsuchida, C. (1934). Saddharmapundarīka-sūtram: Romanized and Revised Text of the Bibliotheca Buddhica Publication, Tokyo: The Sankibo Buddhist Book Store

External links 
 10 suchnesses in Rissho Kosei-kai Teachings
 Hsuan Hua, The Dharma Flower Sutra, A Commentary by the Venerable Master Hsuan Hua, chapter 2, Buddhist Text Translation Society
 

Buddhist philosophical concepts
Nichiren Buddhism
Tiantai